This is a list of  Spanish words that come from Turkic languages.  It is further divided into words that come from Kazakh, Kyrgyz Tatar, and Turkish.  Some of these words existed in Latin as loanwords from other languages.  Some of these words have alternate etymologies and may also appear on a list of Spanish words from a different language, especially including Arabic and Persian languages.

List
bajá, pachá
bergamota 
calmuco 
caracul 
caviar 
chacal 
cosaco 
horda 
húngaro 
huno 
kan/jan = khan, an honorific title from Turko-Mongol
odalisca 
otomano 
quiosco, kiosco
sorbete 
Turco 
turquesa 
visir
yogur

Kazakh

Kyrgyz

Tatar

Turkish

See also
Linguistic history of Spanish
List of English words of Spanish origin
janizari=yeniçeri (name given to Turkish soldiers in the Ottoman Empire)

References
"Breve diccionario etimológico de la lengua española" by Guido Gómez de Silva

Turkic
Spanish